Jacob Bailey is the name of:

Jacob Bailey (author) (1731–1808), Church of England clergyman and author
Jacob Whitman Bailey (1811–1857), American naturalist
Jacob Bailey Moore (1797–1853), American journalist and historical writer
Jake Bailey (make-up artist) (1978–2015), American make-up artist and photographer

See also 
Jake Bailey (American football), American professional football punter for the New England Patriots